The Metrocom Intelligence and Security Group (MISG) was the branch of the Philippine Constabulary's Metropolitan Command under the administration of President Ferdinand Marcos. It was responsible for maintaining peace and order though its unit tasked with going after insurgents was linked to human rights violations at the time. It was headed by Rolando Abadilla.

References

Presidency of Ferdinand Marcos
Secret police